Shawn Evans (born April 28, 1986, in Peterborough, Ontario) is a Canadian professional lacrosse player who plays for the Vancouver Warriors in the National Lacrosse League, and the Connecticut Hammerheads of Major League Lacrosse. Evans' brothers, Scott and Stephen have also played in the NLL. Evans is one of two lacrosse player in history to win the Minto Cup (the Canadian Junior lacrosse title), the Mann Cup (the Canadian Senior lacrosse title), and the NLL Champion's Cup all within 12 months of each other. He is also only one of three lacrosse players in history (the others being Craig Conn and Mark Matthews) to win 2 Minto Cups back to back (2006 & 2007) with 2 different Junior teams.

In May 2013, after winning the scoring title with 112 points, Evans was named NLL MVP.

Junior career
During his seven-year tenure with the Peterborough Lakers and the Six Nations Arrows, Evans scored 199 goals and 462 points. He also finished his playoff career with 71 goals and 194 points. In combination with his regular season and playoff points, Evans his ranked 29th all time in Canadian Junior A lacrosse history with 656.

Evans' awards and accomplishments during his junior career include:

 2 Bobby Allan Awards (top scorer) - (2006–2007)
 2 OLA Jr.A regular season MVP awards - (2006–2007)
 3 Jim Veltman Awards (Most outstanding player) - (2005–2007)
 1 OLA Jr.A championship - (2007 with the Six Nations Arrows)
 2 Minto Cup National Championships - (2006 with the Peterborough Lakers, 2007 with the Six Nations Arrows)
 1 Minto Cup M.V.P award - (2006)

College career
Evans played a year of NCAA Division I lacrosse at Bellarmine University in 2005. He was the leading freshman scorer that year totalling 53 goals and 21 assists for 74 points.

Statistics

NLL
Reference:

OLA Jr.A

MSL

MLL

Awards

References

1986 births
Living people
Bellarmine Knights men's lacrosse players
Canadian expatriate lacrosse people in the United States
Canadian lacrosse players
Lacrosse forwards
Lacrosse people from Ontario
National Lacrosse League major award winners
Rochester Knighthawks players
Calgary Roughnecks players
Sportspeople from Peterborough, Ontario